Nationality words link to articles with information on the nation's poetry or literature (for instance, Irish or France).

Events

 Guillaume de Salluste Du Bartas begins work on his major poem, Semaine. It was published in France in 1577.

Works published
 Guillaume de Salluste Du Bartas, La Muse chrétienne, a theoretical work that advocates a Christian poetry; published along with several didactic poems, including Judith, Uranie and Le Triomphe de la foi, Bordeaux, France
The Mirror for Magistrates (anthology)
 Pierre de Ronsard, La Franciade, France
 Mellin de Saint-Gelais, Œuvres ("Works"), France

Births
 July 1 – Joseph Hall (died 1656), English bishop, satirist, moralist, and poet
 Also:
 Gerolamo Aleandro (died 1629), Italian, Latin-language poet
 Richard Barnfield (died 1620), English poet,
 Nicholas Bourbon (died 1644), French clergyman and neo-Latin poet
 Nicolas Coeffeteau (died 1623), French theologian, poet and historian
 John Day born about this year (died c. 1640), English poet and playwright
 Feng Menglong (died 1645), Chinese writer and poet
 William Percy (died 1648), English poet

Deaths
 June 17 – Louis Des Masures (born c. 1515), French
 December – Selim II (born 1524), Ottoman Empire sultan and poet
 Also:
 Rocco Boni, Italian, Latin-language poet
 Girolamo Amalteo of Oderzo (born 1507), Italian poet who wrote in Latin

See also

 Poetry
 16th century in poetry
 16th century in literature
 Dutch Renaissance and Golden Age literature
 Elizabethan literature
 French Renaissance literature
 Renaissance literature
 Spanish Renaissance literature

Notes

16th-century poetry
Poetry